Ken Hung Cheuk Lap is a Hong Kong cantopop singer. He started his career after earning a second place in the EEG Singing Contest (aka 25th annual New Talent Singing Awards Hong Kong Regional Finals). During 2007, he went to help in the office for about 3–4 months cutting newspapers because his manager Mani Fok said he was too shy. Then he finally started recording songs, with his first song being "Love.gutless" (愛．無膽).

During 2008, he suffered his first bout of hydrothorax, which stopped him from working for most of 2008 until the filming of Love is Elsewhere.  However, the problem returned late in 2008, his condition deteriorated and he was hospitalized.  He had to cease all work including the filming of the drama Prince & Princess 2 in Taiwan.  He was later released from the hospital.  He is now working on the promotion of the movie Happily Ever After.

Discography
2007 – Love. Gutless (愛．無膽) – 19 July
2007 – Love. Gutless 2nd version (愛．無膽) – 7 September
2008 – Go – 23 January
2008 – Next Attraction – 30 October – Informations from his official blog
2010 – Taste of Love + Best Selections – 29 March
2010 – Precious Moment  – 24 September
2011 – Penetration (透視) – 27 May
2012 – Grown Up – 21 March + Looking for a girl who knows me (找個懂我的女孩) – 6 July
2013 – All Around Us – 25 April

Movies
2008 – Love Is Elsewhere (愛情萬歲) 17 April
2008 – Connected (保持通話) 25 September
2009 – Happily Ever After (很想和你在一起) 27 August
2010 – The Jade and the Pearl
2010 – Perfect Wedding
2011 – Love Is the Only Answer
2012 – Nightfall
2012 – Fortune Cookies
2013 – 4 in Life
2014 – As the Light Goes Out
2016 – The Mobfathers

Series
2008 – Dressage To Win (盛裝舞步愛作戰) 14 June
2008 – Prince + Princess 2 (王子看見二公主) (Taiwan)
2010 – The Rippling Blossom (魚躍在花見)
2012 – Happy Marshal

Awards
2006 – EEG Singing Contest (second place) (Refer to New Talent Singing Awards)
2007 – Commercial Radio Hong Kong "Best New Male Singer" – Gold Award

References

External links
another Ken Hung's blog
Ken Hung's blog
Ken Hung forum
Ken Hung International Fans Club forum
EEG Official Website- Ken Hung

1987 births
Hong Kong male singers
Living people
New Talent Singing Awards contestants